Jop van Steen (born 21 December 1984) is a Dutch former footballer.

Club career
He made his professional debut in the Eerste Divisie for Achilles '29 on 3 August 2013 in a game against FC Emmen.

References

External links
 
 

1984 births
Living people
Footballers from Nijmegen
Dutch footballers
Achilles '29 players
FC Lienden players
Eerste Divisie players
Association football midfielders
Quick 1888 players
Juliana '31 players